The 1917–18 Tennessee Volunteers basketball team represents the University of Tennessee during the 1917–18 college men's basketball season. The head coach was  coaching the Volunteers in his first season. The Volunteers team captain was Frank Callaway.

Schedule

|-

References

Tennessee Volunteers basketball seasons
Tennessee
Tennessee Volunteers
Tennessee Volunteers